Lohe hambad is a novel by Estonian author Karl Ristikivi. It was first published in 1970 in Lund, Sweden by Eesti Kirjanike Kooperatiiv (Estonian Writers' Cooperative). In Estonia it was published in 1987.

1970 novels
Novels by Karl Ristikivi